Olivier Cassan (born 1 June 1984) is a French professional football midfielder who plays for UN Käerjéng 97.

Career
Born in Rodez, Cassan started his career with Onet-le-Château, assisting the Division d'Honneur club for three seasons between 2002 and 2005. At the start of the 2005–06 season he was signed by his hometown club, Championnat de France amateur side Rodez. He was part of the team that won promotion to the Championnat National two years later. Cassan established himself as a first-team regular at Rodez, appearing in more than 150 league matches for the club.

On 29 June 2010, Cassan transferred to Ligue 2 club Metz on a three-year contract. He made 11 league appearances in the 2010–11 season and scored his first goal for the club in the 2–2 draw away at Tours on 4 October. However, he fell out of favour at Metz and was not selected for any first-team matches during the first half of the 2011–12 campaign. On 3 January 2012, it was announced that Cassan had joined National outfit Martigues on loan until the end of the season.

Ahead of the 2019/20 season, Cassan joined CSO Amnéville.

References
General

Olivier Cassan player profile at FootNational 
Specific

External links

1984 births
Living people
People from Rodez
French footballers
Association football midfielders
Rodez AF players
FC Metz players
FC Martigues players
FC Progrès Niederkorn players
UN Käerjéng 97 players
CSO Amnéville players
Luxembourg National Division players
Championnat National 2 players
Championnat National players
Ligue 2 players
Sportspeople from Aveyron
French expatriate sportspeople in Luxembourg
Expatriate footballers in Luxembourg
French expatriate footballers
Footballers from Occitania (administrative region)